The Arnprior Solar Project is a 23.4 MW solar farm located near the town of near Arnprior, Ontario, Canada. It was developed and is owned by EDF EN Canada and is operated by EDF Renewable Services, both units of EDF Energies Nouvelles. Construction began in May 2009 and operation commenced in December 2009.

The project consists of 312,000 PV thin film solar panels made by First Solar and mounted on 13,000 fixed-tilt racks in a  field.

See also

Solar power in Canada
Photovoltaic power stations

References

Solar power stations in Ontario
2009 establishments in Ontario